Štorovo is a small settlement north of the village of Ravnik in the Municipality of Bloke in the Inner Carniola region of Slovenia.

References

External links
Štorovo on Geopedia

Populated places in the Municipality of Bloke